St. Ignatius Church is a historic Roman Catholic Church located at Forest Hill, Harford County, Maryland. It is a rubble stone, one-story rectangular structure of five bays, with a tall tower at the west end and a rubble stone two-story rectangular addition. The original 35 feet by 50 feet church was built between 1786 and 1792.

A major addition was made in 1848 and the tower was added in 1865. The parish hall wing was constructed in 1822 and a small frame sacristy was added in 1887.  It is the oldest extant church in the Archdiocese of Baltimore.

It was listed on the National Register of Historic Places in 1974.

Notable burials
Thomas H. Robinson (1859–1930), member of Maryland Senate and Attorney General of Maryland

References

External links
, including photo from 1973, at Maryland Historical Trust
St. Ignatius Catholic Church, 533 East Jarrettsville Road, Hickory, Harford, MD at the Historic American Buildings Survey (HABS)

Churches in the Roman Catholic Archdiocese of Baltimore
Roman Catholic churches in Maryland
Churches in Harford County, Maryland
Churches on the National Register of Historic Places in Maryland
Churches completed in 1789
Historic American Buildings Survey in Maryland
1789 establishments in Maryland
18th-century Roman Catholic church buildings in the United States
National Register of Historic Places in Harford County, Maryland